This is a list of all matches contested between the Spanish football clubs Barcelona and Real Madrid, a fixture known as El Clásico.

The club name in bold indicates a win for that team. The score is given at full-time and half-time (in brackets), and in the goals columns, the goalscorer and time when goal was scored is noted.

Competitive matches

Primera División matches
Barcelona and Real Madrid have faced each other in every La Liga season since its inception in 1929, as inaugural members and two of the only three teams (the other being Athletic Bilbao) to have never been relegated from the Primera División.

Summary

Copa del Rey matches
The Copa del Rey is the oldest competition in the history of Spanish football.

Summary

Copa de la Liga matches
The Copa de la Liga was a tournament created in 1982, but low support from the participating clubs saw it disbanded four years later.

Summary

Supercopa de España matches
The Supercopa de España is a super cup competition. Between 1983 and 2017, it was a two-legged match between the previous season's La Liga and Copa del Rey winners. The current format was introduced in the 2019–20 edition, and now features four teams (the previous season's top two teams in La Liga, and the winners and runners-up of the Copa del Rey).

Summary

Copa de la Coronación
Although the Copa de la Coronación is not recognized by the current Royal Spanish Football Federation as an official tournament, it is still considered a competitive match between Barcelona and Real Madrid by statistics sources and the media.

Summary

UEFA Champions League matches
In the European's most prestigious continental tournament, Barcelona and Real Madrid have faced each other on several occasions. The Champions League was known as the European Cup prior to 1992.

Summary

Summary of all competitive matches

Friendlies and other matches
Real Madrid and Barcelona have played 34 friendly matches. Before the start of La Liga championship in 1929, the two clubs played exhibition matches and friendlies on a more frequent basis than after the national league commenced. After 1929, such games have been tributes or part of pre-season tournaments of a friendly nature. The last friendly match took place on 23 July 2022.

Summary

Summary of all matches

Reserve teams matches
Barcelona Atlètic was founded as the Barcelona's reserve team in 1970 with the merger of Condal (Barcelona's previous reserve team) and Atlètic Catalunya. Castilla was founded as Real Madrid's reserve team in 1972, after the folding of A.D. Plus Ultra (Real Madrid's previous reserve team). Both teams would meet for the first time during the third round of the 1974–75 Copa del Generalísimo and then again during the 1982–83 Segunda División season.

The reserve teams normally meet only when both are competing in the second tier, as they are placed in different regional groups at lower levels, and they are not permitted to enter the Copa del Rey.

Summary

Copa del Rey matches between first teams and reserve teams

Legends matches

Summary

Women's teams matches

Primera División (women)

Summary

Copa de la Reina

Summary

Supercopa de España Femenina

Summary

UEFA Women's Champions League

Summary

Summary of all competitive matches (women)

See also
 El Clásico (basketball)

Notes

References

 El Clásico matches
El Clásico
El Clásico
El Clásico matches